Robert Nash may refer to:

 Bob Nash (American football) (1892–1977), American football player
 Bob Nash (basketball) (born 1950), American college basketball coach
 Robert Nash (Australian footballer) (1884–1958), Australian rules footballer
Robert Nash, North Carolina General Assembly of 1778
Robert Nash, actor in US film Mutiny in Outer Space (1965)
Robert Nash, character in TV Series 9-1-1

See also